Caladenia alata, commonly known as the fairy orchid, is a plant in the orchid family Orchidaceae and is found in south-eastern Australia and New Zealand. It is a ground orchid with small, usually short-lived flowers, which have relatively stiffly held petals and sepals and reddish-purple bars on the labellum.

Description
Caladenia alata is a terrestrial, perennial, deciduous, herb, usually solitary but sometimes in groups of up to twenty individuals.

The dorsal sepal is erect, about the same length or slightly shorter than the lateral sepals, and narrow elliptic in shape. The lateral lobes are large and broad with a smooth edge. There are two rows of stalked, club-shaped, yellow calli on the mid-lobe. Flowering occurs from August to October.

Taxonomy and naming
Caladenia alata was first formally described by Robert Brown in 1810 and the description was published in Prodromus Florae Novae Hollandiae. The specific epithet (alata) is a Latin word meaning "winged".

Distribution and habitat
Fairy orchid grows in forest and woodland in moist places, often in steep, rocky places but also in swamps and at lake edges. In New Zealand it sometimes occurs around hot springs. The distribution is not well understood because the flowers are small and ephemeral but it has been recorded in south-east Queensland, the coast and tablelands of New South Wales, near-coastal areas of Victoria east of Wilsons Promontory and in Tasmania. In New Zealand it is confined to the North Island, mainly between Te Paki and Rotorua.

References

alata
Plants described in 1810
Endemic orchids of Australia
Orchids of New South Wales
Orchids of Queensland
Orchids of Victoria (Australia)
Orchids of Tasmania
Orchids of New Zealand
Taxa named by Robert Brown (botanist, born 1773)